VK Osijek (VK Kruna-Osijek) is a water polo club from Osijek, Croatia.

Currently, VK Osijek competes in the 1. B Croatian League of Water Polo.

VK Osijek was established in 1946 as "VK Sloga", as part of sports society "Sloga".

External links 
 Official web-site

Sport in Osijek
Sports clubs established in 1946
Water polo clubs in Croatia
1946 establishments in Croatia